Famiano Meneschincheri (born 13 November 1957) is an Italian former professional tennis player.

Born in Rome, Meneschincheri is nicknamed "Mino" and comes from a tennis playing family. His younger brother Marco, as well as cousins Roberto and Stefano, were all professional tennis players.

Meneschincheri's best performances on the Grand Prix tennis circuit came in 1980 when he made the second round of the Japan Open and Sofia Open. On the ATP Challenger Tour, he was a semi-finalist at Kaduna in 1981.

References

External links
 
 

1957 births
Living people
Italian male tennis players
Tennis players from Rome